Found largely in temperate and tropical climates, currently there are more than 112 known species of bioluminescent fungi, all of which are members of the order Agaricales (Basidiomycota) with one exceptional ascomycete belonging to the order Xylariales. All known bioluminescent Agaricales are mushroom-forming, white-spored agarics that belong to four distinct evolutionary lineages. The Omphalotus lineage (comprising the genera Omphalotus and Neonothopanus) contains 12 species, the Armillaria lineage has 10 known species, while the Mycenoid lineage (Favolachia, Mycena, Panellus, Prunulus, Roridomyces) has more than 50 species. The recently discovered Lucentipes lineage contains two species, Mycena lucentipes and Gerronema viridilucens, which belong to a family that has not yet been formally named. Armillaria mellea is the most widely distributed of the luminescent fungi, found across Asia, Europe, North America, and South Africa.

Bioluminescent fungi emit a greenish light at a wavelength of 520–530 nm. The light emission is continuous and occurs only in living cells. No correlation of fungal bioluminescence with cell structure has been found. Bioluminescence may occur in both mycelia and fruit bodies, as in Panellus stipticus and Omphalotus olearius, or only in mycelia and young rhizomorphs, as in Armillaria mellea. In Roridomyces roridus luminescence occurs only in the spores, while in Collybia tuberosa, it is only in the sclerotia.

Although the biochemistry of fungal bioluminescence has not fully been characterized, the preparation of bioluminescent, cell-free extracts has allowed researchers to characterize the in vitro requirements of fungal bioluminescence. Experimental data suggest that a two-stage mechanism is required. In the first, a light-emitting substance (called "luciferin") is reduced by a soluble reductase enzyme at the expense of NAD(P)H. In the second stage, reduced luciferin is oxidized by an insoluble luciferase that releases the energy in the form of bluish-green light. Conditions that affect the growth of fungi, such as pH, light and temperature, have been found to influence bioluminescence, suggesting a link between metabolic activity and fungal bioluminescence.

All bioluminescent fungi share the same enzymatic mechanism, suggesting that there is a bioluminescent pathway that arose early in the evolution of the mushroom-forming Agaricales. All known luminescent species are white rot fungi capable of breaking down lignin, found in abundance in wood. Bioluminescence is an oxygen-dependent metabolic process and therefore may provide antioxidant protection against the potentially damaging effects of reactive oxygen species produced during wood decay. 

The physiological and ecological function of fungal bioluminescence has not been established with certainty. It has been suggested that in the dark beneath closed tropical forest canopies, bioluminescent fruit bodies may be at an advantage by attracting grazing animals (including insects and other arthropods) that could help disperse their spores. Conversely, where mycelium (and vegetative structures like rhizomorphs and sclerotia) are the bioluminescent tissues, the argument has been made that light emission could deter grazing.

The following list of bioluminescent mushrooms is based on a 2008 literature survey by Dennis Desjardin and colleagues, in addition to accounts of several new species published since then.

Species

 Binomial
 The binomial name of the fungal species, including the author citation—the person who first described the species using an available scientific name, using standardized abbreviations.
 Luminescence
 Indicates which form of the fungus—mycelium or fruit body—produces luminescence.
 Distribution
 The geographical distribution of the species. AF = Africa; AS = Asia; AU = Australasia; CA = Central America and the Caribbean; EU = Europe; NA = North America; SA = South America.
 References
 Literature sources where bioluminescence was reported.

See also
List of bioluminescent organisms

Notes

References

External links
 Glow-in-the-Dark Mushrooms National Geographic
 Bioluminescence in the Bush - Glow in the Dark Mushrooms in New Zealand
 A Luminous Pursuit

Bioluminescent fungi, List of